The 2010 All Stars Match was the first time the event was held. The match was a pre season game between representative teams, Indigenous Australians versus the best in the National Rugby League and took place at the Gold Coast's Skilled Park on 13 February 2010. The Indigenous team featured 20 players of aboriginal descent chosen by public votes. Preston Campbell was selected automatically as Indigenous captain. The NRL All Stars featured one player from each of the 16 NRL teams as well as the Australian and New Zealand captains and deputy captains. Along with other rule changes exclusive to the match, the game trialled a new "Double Try" rule where a team can choose to swap a conversion attempt for a second try attempt.

The maiden match was won by the Indigenous All Stars 16–12 with North Queensland Cowboys player Johnathan Thurston winning the inaugural Preston Campbell Medal for player of the match.

Team lists

1 - Justin Hodges was originally selected but withdrew due to injury (replaced by Blake Ferguson).
2 - Dave Taylor was originally selected but withdrew due to injury (replaced by Sam Burgess) .
3 - Gareth Ellis was originally selected but withdrew due to personal reasons (replaced by Robbie Farah).
4 - Alan Tongue was originally selected but withdrew due to injury (replaced by David Shillington).
5 - Daine Laurie was originally selected but withdrew due to injury (replaced by Greg Bird).
6 - Greg Inglis was originally selected but withdrew due to injury (replaced by Beau Champion).
7 - PJ Marsh was originally selected but withdrew due to injury (replaced by Ben Jones).
8 - Billy Slater was originally selected but withdrew due to injury (replaced by Brett Finch).
9 - Jamal Idris was originally selected but withdrew due to injury (replaced by Ty Williams).

Result

Selection process

NRL All Stars
Default selections

The following four players were automatically selected to the All Stars team due their captain or vice-captain roles for their Australian or New Zealand team.
 Australian captain (Broncos): Darren Lockyer (captain)
 Australian vice-captain (Storm): Cameron Smith
 New Zealand captain (Tigers): Benji Marshall
 New Zealand vice-captain (Storm): Adam Blair

Selected by public vote

The following were selected by the public through the official NRL website. Voters were required to select one forward-position player and one back-position player from all sixteen teams. The most voted player from their respected position of each team were selected to the All Stars team.

  Broncos – Israel Folau
  Bulldogs – Josh Morris
  Cowboys – Luke O'Donnell
  Dragons – Matt Cooper
  Eels – Jarryd Hayne
  Knights – Kurt Gidley
  Panthers – Michael Jennings
  Rabbitohs – David Taylor
  Raiders – Alan Tongue
  Roosters – Nate Myles
   Sea Eagles – Anthony Watmough
  Sharks – Anthony Tupou
  Storm – Billy Slater
  Tigers – Gareth Ellis
  Titans – Luke Bailey
  Warriors – Manu Vatuvei

The following players were called up due to injuries or other causes to the initial squad. The second highest voted player for their forward or back positions of their team were called to the squad.
  Rabbitohs – David Taylor replaced by Sam Burgess.
  Tigers – Gareth Ellis replaced by Robbie Farah.
  Raiders – Alan Tongue replaced by David Shillington
  Storm – Billy Slater replaced by Brett Finch

Indigenous All Stars Squad
Default Selection
  Titans – Preston Campbell (captain)

ARL Indigenous Council selected players
  Broncos – Jharal Yow Yeh
  Raiders – Joel Thompson
  Raiders – Travis Waddell

Selected by public vote
  Broncos – Justin Hodges
  Broncos – PJ Marsh
  Broncos – Sam Thaiday
  Bulldogs – Jamal Idris
  Bulldogs –Yileen Gordon
  Cowboys – Carl Webb
  Cowboys – Johnathan Thurston
  Dragons – Jamie Soward
  Knights – Cory Paterson
  Panthers – Daine Laurie
  Rabbitohs – Nathan Merritt
  Raiders – Tom Learoyd-Lahrs
  Sea Eagles – George Rose
  Storm – Greg Inglis
  Titans – Scott Prince
 Wendell Sailor (retired)

The following players were called up due to injuries to the initial squad.
  Broncos – Justin Hodges replaced by  Sharks –  Blake Ferguson
  Panthers – Daine Laurie replaced by  Titans –  Greg Bird
  Storm – Greg Inglis replaced by   Rabbitohs – Beau Champion
  Broncos – PJ Marsh replaced by  Roosters – Ben Jones
  Bulldogs – Jamal Idris replaced by   Cowboys – Ty Williams

Injuries
For the Indigenous All Stars, Justin Hodges who had ruptured his Achilles heel at Broncos training, was replaced by Blake Ferguson, Daine Laurie injured himself and was replaced by Greg Bird and Greg Inglis had a hip injury and was replaced by Beau Champion. PJ Marsh withdrew due to back spasms and was replaced by Ben Jones. Jamal Idris injured himself and was replaced by Ty Williams.

In the NRL All Stars, David Taylor injured his ankle at training and was replaced by Sam Burgess, Gareth Ellis was sent home on compassionate grounds because of the birth of his first child and was replaced by Robbie Farah and Alan Tongue injured himself and was replaced by David Shillington. Billy Slater withdrew due to an ankle injury and was replaced by Brett Finch.

References

External links
Australian Rugby League announcement

2010 NRL season
Rugby league on the Gold Coast, Queensland
2010
February 2010 sports events in Australia